Liv Hill (born 22 June 2000) is a British actress. She received accolades for her roles in the BBC miniseries Three Girls (2017) and the films  Jellyfish and  The Little Stranger (2018). She has since appeared in The Fight (2018), Elizabeth is Missing (2019), and The Great (2020). She played a young Catherine de' Medici in The Serpent Queen (2022).

Life
Hill was born in Haverfordwest, Wales. Her father was an Army Officer which led to her living in Cardiff, Germany, Oxford and Nottingham before her family settled in Derbyshire, when she was 9 years old. At age 15, Hill joined Talent 1st actors’ studio in Nottingham.

Career
In 2017, Hill was BAFTA nominated for best supporting actress  in her debut role in the BBC miniseries Three Girls, which was based on the Rochdale child sex abuse ring. In 2018, Hill was cast in the James Gardner directed British film Jellyfish, receiving a BIFA Nominated Most promising newcomer for her performance as plays care worker Sarah. The same year, Hill played Eve in episode 5: "Reclaim the Night" of Snatches: Moments from Women's Lives, a series which also included Jodie Comer.

In 2022, she portrayed the younger Catherine de' Medici in the TV series The Serpent Queen.

Filmography

Awards and nominations

References

External links

Interview with Samantha Morton and Liv Hill of STARZ “The Serpent Queen”
SueTerry Voices Profile

Living people
2000 births
British television actresses
Welsh stage actresses
Welsh film actresses
Welsh television actresses